Genital disease may refer to:
 Sexually transmitted disease
 Other female genital disease
 Other male genital disease